This list of tallest buildings in Guiyang ranks skyscrapers in Guiyang, Guizhou, China by height. The tallest building in Guiyang is currently the Guiyang International Financial Center, which rises 401 m (1,315 feet).

With a metro population over 3,4 million, Guiyiang is the third largest city in Western China and the provincial capital city in Guizhou Provinces.

It is the political, economical, cultural, educational, financial and transportational center of Guizhou province.

Tallest buildings
This lists ranks Guiyang skyscrapers that stand at least 95 m (311 feet) tall, based on standard height measurement. This includes spires and architectural details but does not include antenna masts. Existing structures are included for ranking purposes based on present height. All the structures in this list has been topped, but some may not be ready to use.

Tallest under construction, approved, and proposed

Under construction
This lists buildings that are under construction in Guiyang and are planned to rise at least . Buildings that have already been topped out are not included.

Proposed
This list buildings that are proposed in Guiyang and that are planned to rise at least . Buildings that have already been topped out are included.

References
General
Skycraperpage.com Guiyang

External links
 List of Guiyang buildings on SkyscraperPage
 List of Guiyang buildings on Emporis
 List of Guiyang skyscrapers on Gaoloumi (in Chinese)

guiyang
Buildings and structures in Guizhou